The 2020–21 Israeli Noar Premier League is the twenty-nine season since its introduction in 1999 and the 81st season of top-tier football in Israel. The season began in August 2020. the previous season was suspended indefinitely due to the coronavirus pandemic on 13 April 2020 Maccabi Haifa were awarded the championship following the cancellation of the 2019–20 season. it was also decided there will be no relegations . Because of the league was stopped due the coronavirus pandemic and the 2021 Israel–Palestine crisis the IFA Announced the league was will be shortened after be completed 75% of the games.

Format

All the 18 teams in the league will compete in single match in the end of the first stage the league will be divided to two parts 8 at Championship round and 10 ar the Relegation round two teams on the relegation round will relegat to the Liga Leumit .

League table

Championship round

Relegation round table

Promotion play-offs
In the first round of the play-offs the second-placed team from Each district from the second League will face in a single match on neutral ground in the second round the winner of the match will face the 16th-placed team in a neutral ground.

First round

Second round

References

External links
 Noar Premier League IFA 

Israeli Noar Premier League seasons
Youth